Clarence Z. Hubbell (August 13, 1869 - 1953) was an American architect. Born in Illinois and educated at the Art Institute of Chicago, he settled in Spokane, Washington in 1900. With John K. Dow, he designed the NRHP-listed Hutton Building. They also designed Van Doren Hall and the Veterinary Science Building on the campus of Washington State University in Pullman, Washington.

References

1869 births
1953 deaths
People from Iroquois County, Illinois
People from Spokane, Washington
School of the Art Institute of Chicago alumni
19th-century American architects
20th-century American architects